Zeynep Eronat (born 9 July 1963) is a Turkish actress.

Life and career 
Eronat was born in 1963 in Istanbul. Due to her father's profession, her childhood years were spent in various cities of Turkey. She started to live in Ankara from the age of 13. With the encouragement of her mother, she won the Theater Department of the Ankara State Conservatory in 1981 and graduated from there in 1985. She received acting lessons from veteran actors. In the same year, she was appointed to Bursa State Theatre as a trainee artist. She was appointed to the Ankara State Theater in 1987. She is known for her role in various movies and TV series, including Asmalı Konak, Neredesin Firuze, Mustafa Hakkında Her şey and Sen Ne Dilersen.

She retired from Ankara State Theatre during the 2006–2007 season and started to live in Istanbul. Eronat received critical acclaim for her portrayal of the character Ziynet Kara in the series Parmaklıklar Ardında. She was also a regular cast member in the series O Hayat Benim.

Theatre 
 Steel Magnolias : Robert Harling - Ankara State Theatre - 2002
 Romulus the Great : Friedrich Dürrenmatt - Ankara State Theatre - 2000
 Bahar Noktası : an adaptation of William Shakespeare's A Midsummer Night's Dream by Can Yücel - Ankara State Theatre - 1993
 Kadınla ile Memur : Aldo Nicolaj - Ankara State Theatre - 1999
 Goya : Antonio Buero Vallejo - Ankara State Theatre - 1998
 Patlat Bir Shakespeare : Semih Sergen - Ankara State Theatre - 1993
 Çocuğum : Margeret Mayo - Ankara State Theatre - 1994
 Tamirci : Refik Erduran - Ankara State Theatre - 1991
 Şeytan Çelmesi : Václav Havel - Ankara State Theatre - 1990
 Troyalı Kadınlar : Sophocles - Ankara State Theatre - 1987
 Sinan : Turan Oflazoğlu - Ankara State Theatre - 1987
 Kısmet : Erhan Gökgücü - Bursa State Theatre - 1986
 Bülbül Sesi Gibi : John Hay Beith\L. du Garde Peach\Roger Ferdinand - Bursa State Theatre - 1986
 Sersem Kocanın Kurnaz Karısı : Haldun Taner - Bursa State Theatre - 1985
 Peynirli Yumurta : Ferenc Karinthy
 Akıllı Tavşan : Nezihe Araz - Bursa State Theatre - 1986
 Yedekçi : Musahipzade Celal - Bursa State Theatre - 1985

Filmography 
 Uzak Şehrin Masalı (2021) - Aliye
 Kırmızı Oda (2021) - Gümüş
 Yüzleşme (2019) - Songül Kalenderoğlu
 Dostlar Mahallesi (2017) - Neriman
 O Hayat Benim (2015) - Mücella
 Kızıl Elma (2014) - Meryem Kadıoğlu
 Karakol (2011) - Leyla
 Al Yazmalım (2011) - Fatma Avcı
 Kapalı Çarşı (2009–2010) - Feraye
 Parmaklıklar Ardında (2007–2010) - Ziynet Kara
 Hayattan Korkma (2007) - Zehra
 Sıla (2006-2007) - Bedar
 Sensiz Olmuyor (2005) - Handan
 Sen Ne Dilersen (2005) - Eftimya
 Nehir (2005) - Melek
 Körfez Ateşi (2005) - voiceover
 Köpek (2005) - Hayriye
 Yağmur Zamanı (2004)
 Türkmen Düğünü (2004)
 Ablam Böyle İstedi (2004) - Nermin
 Serseri (2003) - Zehra
 Neredesin Firuze (2003) - Sansar
 Mustafa Hakkında Herşey (2003) - Selda
 Fişgittin Bey (2003)
 Ben Bir İnsan (2002)
 Asmalı Konak (2002) - Piraye
 Vasiyet (2001) - Didar
 Baykuşların Saltanatı (2000)
 Köstebek (1999) - Necef 
 Cafe Casablanca (1996)
 Issızlığın Ortası (1991)

References

External links 
 
 Zeynep Eronat at 

1963 births
Turkish television actresses
Turkish film actresses
Actresses from Istanbul
Golden Butterfly Award winners
Turkish stage actresses
Turkish voice actresses
Living people